Denbigh is a town in Wales, United Kingdom.

Denbigh may also refer to:

People with the name
Earl of Denbigh, various holders of the title of nobility in the Peerage of England
Kenneth Denbigh (1911-2004), British, chemical thermodynamics researcher

Places

Australia
Denbigh, Cobbitty, a heritage-listed farm in Sydney, New South Wales

Canada
Denbigh, Ontario, part of the township of Addington Highlands

United Kingdom
Denbigh, a town in north Wales
Denbigh (UK Parliament constituency), 1918–1983
Denbigh Boroughs (UK Parliament constituency), 1542–1918
Denbigh, Milton Keynes, Buckinghamshire, England

United States
 Denbigh, Virginia, a neighborhood in Newport News, Virginia
 Denbigh Plantation Site
 Denbigh, North Dakota, a town near Lake Souris
 Cape Denbigh, a headland in Seward Peninsula, Alaska

Other uses
Denbigh (ship), a blockade runner in the American Civil War
Denbigh Flint complex, a Bronze-Age, Paleo-Inuit culture of the American Arctic

See also
Denbigh School, Shenley Church End, Milton Keynes, England
Denbighshire, a county (and principal administrative area) of Wales
Denbighshire (historic), a larger, traditional county of Wales
Denby (disambiguation)